Lozi may refer to:

 Lozi language
 Lozi people
 Lozi (Homeland), a Bantustan in South West Africa

Language and nationality disambiguation pages